The 2019–20 Sport Lisboa e Benfica season was the club's 116th season in existence and its 86th consecutive season in the top flight of Portuguese football. It started with a 5–0 win over Sporting CP in the Supertaça Cândido de Oliveira, on 4 August 2019, and concluded with a 2–1 loss to FC Porto in the Taça de Portugal final, on 1 August 2020.

Players

Appearances and goals

|-
! colspan=18 style=background:#dcdcdc; text-align:center|Goalkeepers

|-
! colspan=18 style=background:#dcdcdc; text-align:center|Defenders

|-
! colspan=18 style=background:#dcdcdc; text-align:center|Midfielders

|-
! colspan=18 style=background:#dcdcdc; text-align:center|Forwards

|-
! colspan=18 style=background:#dcdcdc; text-align:center|Players who made an appearance and/or had a squad number but left the team

|}

Coaching staff

{| class="wikitable"
|-
! Position
! Name
|-
| Head coach
| Nélson Veríssimo
|-
| Assistant coaches
| Minervino PietraMarco Pedroso
|-
| Goalkeeping coach
| Fernando Ferreira
|-
| Observer assistant coach
| Marco Pedroso
|-
| Video analyst
| Jhony Conceição

Pre-season friendlies
On 15 June 2019, Benfica announced their pre-season schedule, which included the following matches:

Benfica won the International Champions Cup.

Competitions

Overall record

Supertaça Cândido de Oliveira

Primeira Liga

League table

Results summary

Results by round

Matches

Taça de Portugal

Taça da Liga

Third round

UEFA Champions League

Group stage

UEFA Europa League

Knockout phase

Round of 32

References

S.L. Benfica seasons
Benfica
Benfica